Kunayavalasa is a village and panchayat in Therlam mandal in Vizianagaram district of Andhra Pradesh.

Demographics
The village comprises 560 households with a total population of 2,230 among which the literates are 925.

References

Villages in Vizianagaram district